Miss Austen Regrets is a 2007 biographical drama television film directed by Jeremy Lovering and written by Gwyneth Hughes. It stars Olivia Williams as Jane Austen, with Imogen Poots, Greta Scacchi, Hugh Bonneville, Adrian Edmondson and Jack Huston. It premiered on 21 August 2007 on BBC 1 in the United Kingdom and on 3 February 2008 in the United States by PBS' drama anthology television series Masterpiece as part of The Complete Jane Austen, the US version of The Jane Austen Season.

Summary 
In 1802, Jane Austen receives a proposal of marriage, which she accepts. Her sister Cassandra is concerned and asks her if she is sure of her choice. By the next morning, Jane has changed her mind, although she wonders if she has made the right decision.

In 1814, Jane and Cassandra attend the wedding of their niece Anna Austen to Benjamin Lefroy. "Favourite aunt" Jane accompanies her niece Fanny and brother Edward Austen-Knight home. Fanny showers her aunt with questions about love, marriage, and particularly, why Jane herself never married. Fanny introduces Jane to one of her potential suitors, Mr. Plumptre, but Jane is unsure if their love is real or not. Admitting that she herself has no experience, Jane still declares that everyone should have the chance to marry once for love.

Jane is startled and surprised to receive an unexpected visit from Fanny's uncle, the Reverend Brook Bridges – a man who has clearly played a part in Jane's past. Reverend Bridges has concerns about Jane as a role model, "leading her young niece astray with her fanciful ideas and clever wit". His worst fears are confirmed when Fanny, convinced that Mr. Plumptre will not propose, blames Jane for standing in the way of her desire to be happily married.

The following year, Jane travels to London where her other brother Henry lives, whom she has asked to accompany her to negotiate with her publisher over her new novel, Emma. Henry suddenly takes ill, and Jane is helped by a young and handsome doctor, Charles Haden, who heals her brother and is able to help secure Emma's publication. Jane is flattered by his attention, and fancies that he admires her for more than her writing. With Fanny's arrival in London, Doctor Haden's attentions turn to her, and Jane becomes sullen and resentful. She returns to Hampshire to continue writing her next novel, but becomes ill herself.

At a family christening, Fanny tells Jane that Mr. Plumptre is engaged to another, and blames Jane for leading her to think him unsuitable. Fanny declares that she will never again trust the opinions of her maiden aunt. Her devoted sister Cassandra tries to comfort Jane, but as she becomes weaker she looks back on her life and wonders if she had made the right choices about love, money, and marriage.

As sickness envelops her, Jane confesses to Cassandra that her only regret about not marrying her rich suitor years ago is that she won't be able to leave Cassandra and her mother financially secure. She admits that everything that she is, and everything she has achieved, has been for her sister, and is much happier than she thought she would be.

In 1820, Cassandra attends Fanny's wedding, alone. At the reception, Fanny seeks Cassandra out only to find her burning the letters that Jane had written to her. Fanny begs her not to destroy them, hoping to finally find the answers to Jane's lost love, but she continues to burn the letters, overcome with grief. As Fanny returns to the party, Jane's words are in her head, telling her to listen to her own heart now. Fanny finally understands her aunt Jane.

Cast

References

External links 
 Miss Austen Regrets at BBC 1
 Miss Austen Regrets at Masterpiece Theatre
 
 

2007 films
2007 biographical drama films
2007 television films
2000s English-language films
2000s historical drama films
American biographical drama films
American historical drama films
BBC television docudramas
Biographical films about writers
British biographical drama films
British historical drama films
Cultural depictions of Jane Austen
American drama television films
Films set in the 1800s
Films set in the 1810s
Films set in the 1820s
Films shot in Buckinghamshire
Films shot in London
Historical television films
Television films based on actual events
Works about Jane Austen
2000s American films
2000s British films
British drama television films